Jonathan Ferreira da Silva (born 3 November 1992), commonly known as Bocão, is a Brazilian footballer who plays as a right back for Confiança.

Club career
Born in Taguatinga, Federal District, Bocão made his senior debuts with Cruzeiro-DF in 2011. On 3 December of the same year he moved to Brasiliense,

On 11 December 2013, Bocão signed for Avaí. He made his professional debut on 19 April of the following year, starting in a 1–3 away loss against América-RN for the Série B championship.

On 6 January 2015, after appearing in 30 matches for Avaí and being promoted to Série A, Bocão joined Goiás.

References

External links

1992 births
Living people
Sportspeople from Federal District (Brazil)
Brazilian footballers
Association football defenders
Campeonato Brasileiro Série B players
Campeonato Brasileiro Série C players
Araguaína Futebol e Regatas players
Brasiliense Futebol Clube players
Avaí FC players
Goiás Esporte Clube players
Clube de Regatas Brasil players
Associação Ferroviária de Esportes players